Daniel Rioli (born 16 April 1997) is a professional Australian rules footballer playing for the Richmond Football Club in the Australian Football League (AFL). He is a three-time premiership player with the club and in 2017 he received the award for the AFL's Goal of the Year.

Early life and junior football
Rioli was born in Fremantle, Western Australia and grew up in Pirlangimpi on Melville Island, among the Tiwi Islands of the Northern Territory. He first attended high school at St John's Catholic College in Darwin and played competitive football with the St Mary's Football Club in the Northern Territory Football League. He moved away from home to Victoria at age 14 however, where he boarded at St Patricks College in Ballarat and played in the school's 2015 state schools championship winning side.

In 2015 he played nine matches for the North Ballarat Rebels in the TAC Cup, including a four-goal performance in the club's qualifying final against the Geelong Falcons.

Rioli played representative football for the Northern Territory in the 2015 Under-18 championships where he appeared in three matches for the side. He went on to play as part of the Under-18s Allies in a match against the AFL Academy held prior to the 2015 AFL Grand Final in which he kicked four goals.

At the 2015 Draft Combine he recorded impressive results, finishing second in the 20 metre sprint and first in the 30 metre repeat sprint tests.

AFL career

2016 season

He made his AFL debut in round 1 of the 2016 AFL season in a victory against the club's traditional rival  at the MCG. He did not play the following week, sitting out one match with a minor leg injury. He missed another match in round 9, this time to travel home because of an illness in the family. At the mid-season bye he had played 10 of a possible 12 matches and kicked six goals over that span. He missed two matches after the bye, this time in rounds 14 and 15 before returning in round 16 and remaining in the side for the final eight matches of the season. He finished his debut season having played 18 matches and kicking a club sixth-best 13 goals. He also finished ranked sixth at the clubs for tackles and was awarded the Cosgrove-Jenkins Award as Richmond's best first-year player.

2017 season

Rioli, along with forward-line companions Jason Castagna and Dan Butler, played a key role in Richmond's five game unbeaten start to the 2017 season. After five rounds the small-forward trio had combined for 23 goals (Rioli with eight) and 44 tackles (10 for Rioli). In addition to his work on-field, Rioli was impressive with his leadership off-field. Captain Trent Cotchin lauded Rioli for his leadership and maturity, saying "He's been nothing short of outstanding and taking other guys that we’ve drafted into the club under his wing this season has been really special.” In April, coach Damien Hardwick said a midfield role lay in Rioli's future, once the young forward developed the aerobic capacity required to play higher up the ground. After six rounds, Rioli was tied-second at the club for goals scored that season. His 76.9% conversion rate was the best of Richmond's top five goal kickers. At the mid-season bye Rioli had played in all 11 Richmond AFL matches and kicked a total of 12 goals. To that point he ranked fourth among all forwards in the league for both turnovers created and points from turnovers created. He turned in a starring performance the next week though, kicking a career-high four goals as he helped Richmond towards their first Grand Final since his uncle Maurice did so in 1982. There he became a premiership player, contributing 11 disposals and five tackles in his side's 48 point victory over minor premiers . He did not come away unscathed however, suffering a broken foot that would require surgery and at least three months of rest and rehabilitation.
At season's end Rioli was named on the bench of the AFL Players' Association's 22 Under 22 team which recognises the best young players in the league. He also received the league Goal of the Year award for his round 3 snap, despite it not winning the fan vote for that round's best. Rioli ranked first at Richmond and eighth in the league for tackles inside 50 in the 2017 season.

2018 season
The lingering effects of his previous year's foot injury saw Rioli miss the entirety of the club's 2018 pre-season training including a second surgery to remove the previously inserted metal plates. Initial forecasts  had Rioli slated to begin running again in early January but these proved overly optimistic. His return to training would instead be delayed until late January, with club officials at that time still remaining optimistic that he would be fit for a round 1 return to AFL action. Again, these predictions proved optimistic, with Rioli ruled no chance to play in round 1 from as far out as early March. He returned to full training after round 5 of the AFL season but club doctors remained tight-lipped on an expected match-day return date given his significant lack of conditioning. He set a personal goal to play in the club's round 11 Dreamtime at the 'G match with Essendon and appeared close to the mark when upgraded to 'possible' on the club's injury list in mid-May. He made his return to competitive football, albeit in limited game-time and via the club's reserve side in the VFL, in the weekend of the AFL's round 9. He played a further three matches at the lower level, increasing playing time with each. There he set a new career-high with eight tackles, was named in the club's best players by the Herald Sun and was one of five Richmond players to earn a vote in the Coaches Association's player of the year award. Two weeks later he attracted similar praise for kicking a two-goal performance in a win over  where he left the field early with a suspected but ultimately unfounded groin injury. Rioli showed no signs of injury the following week, when he kicked a season-best three goals in a tight loss to the  that saw him labelled in Richmond's best by AFL Media. After playing the final 10 consecutive matches of the home and away season, Rioli entered the finals series with the minor premiership winning Richmond hosting fourth placed  in a qualifying final. Rioli added three goals in what was ultimately a 31-point win, including a notable dribble kick goal in the second quarter of that match. In the week-long break that followed, Rioli suffered a minor finger injury while completing a club training session. Despite some initial concern about the injury, Rioli would not miss a training session after scans confirmed the injury to be nothing more than a minor jarring. He played at full health and recorded 14 disposals in the club's preliminary final, a shock knock-out loss to  that brought his season to an end. Rioli finished the season having played 12 matches and set new career best averages in all major statistical categories including goals, disposals, marks and tackles.

2019 season

Rioli spend the 2018/19 off-season training as a part time midfielder in addition to his forward-line duties. He was among Richmond's best players in the first of his club's two pre-season matches, where he spend part of his time playing as a midfielder. After playing in the season-opening match against Carlton, Rioli kicked his first goal of the season in round 2 against  at the MCG. Rioli did not miss a match as a direct result of that injury, but in round 7 suffered more damage with thigh, hip and rib bruising sustained in a marking contest that would lead to him to be ruled out from playing the following week. After one week rest and recovery, Rioli failed to earn immediate selection to AFL level, instead playing one match with the club's reserves side in the VFL. Rioli returned to AFL level for the Dreamtime at the 'G match in round 10, wearing a guernsey he had designed with his mother and father and that featured imagery central to his family and the Tiwi Islands that were his childhood home, including the family totem of the turtle. He could not hold his place past that match however, immediately dropped back to VFL level the next week. He lifted his goalkicking tally over the next month, with five goals across the three weeks from round 13. In round 17 he recorded a season-best 18 disposals in a win over the Giants. Rioli closed out the regular season with form The Age described as "patchy", kicking three goals in total and only twice gathering more than 15 disposals in the final six weeks of the season.
The injury did not require significant treatment or rehabilitation and allowed Rioli to play a full match in his side's preliminary final victory over  a fortnight later. His output was poor in that match however, going scoreless, contributing only nine disposals and with AFL Media noting he "didn't provide enough forward pressure." In the grand final against , AFL Media labelled Rioli "fantastic in the forward half of the ground" despite a modest stat line that included one goal and four tackles in his side's 89-point victory that earned him a second premiership in three years. At the end of the year, Rioli placed equal-tenth in the club's best and fairest count alongside fellow small forward Jason Castagna.

2020 season
He received four Coaches' Association award votes for his performance in that match, which was played without a crowd in attendance due to public health prohibitions on large gatherings imposed as a result of the rapid progression of the coronavirus pandemic into Australia. It was the first match of a reduced 17-round season, which was also played with quarter lengths reduced by one fifth in order to reduce the physical load on players who would be expected to play multiple matches with short breaks in the second half of the year. Just three days later, the AFL Commission suspended the season for an indefinite period after multiple states enforced quarantine conditions on their borders that effectively ruled out the possibility of continuing the season as planned. Rioli contributed six disposals when the season resumed in June after an 11-week hiatus, before another six disposal outing in round 3 saw him omitted from the club's round 4 lineup. He instead played in an unofficial scratch match against 's reserves that same week, held due to all AFL clubs' withdrawal from the VFL season. Rioli held his spot for a further three matches, over which time the club was relocated to the Gold Coast in response to a virus outbreak in Melbourne. He was once again dropped from senior football in round 10, this time following an eight disposal outing against  the previous week. He was among his side's best during round 13's Dreamtime in Darwin match, recording 16 disposals, a team-high five tackles and kicking a goal in his first AFL match in his Northern Territory home. He finished the year having played 18 of a possible 21 matches, and placed equal 14th in the club's best and fairest count.

2021 season
Rioli was hampered by part of the 2021 pre-season training period with an ankle injury, but was ultimately recovered to feature in both the club's pre-season match against  and its season-opening match against . After recording seven disposals in round 2, Rioli was formally omitted from the club's round 3 side, though ultimately activated as a medical substitute to replace the injured Dion Prestia in that match. He was again dropped the following week, but played reserves football in the VFL. In early May, Rioli was punched in the face by a nightclub patron who he confronted for inappropriate behaviour to his girlfriend. Following a seven-disposal showing in round 10, Rioli was once again dropped from the first-choice senior side, but was used as the medical substitute in each of the following two matches. He was returned to the starting lineup for a single game in round 13, before being dropped to reserves level for an extended period. Rioli was trialed in a new role as a half-back during his stint at VFL level and was immediately impressive, earning elevation to the club's AFL backline in round 17 following a 26-disposal game in the VFL and an injury to veteran half-back Bachar Houli. Rioli grew well into the role over the final seven weeks of the season, playing in each match and recording 20 more disposals on three occasions. With the club failing to qualify for finals, Rioli's season ended at the conclusion of the regular reason, having played 19 matches.

Player profile
Rioli plays primarily as a rebounding half back. He is notable for his acceleration and sprint speed while carrying the ball out of defence.

For the first five and a half seasons of this career, Rioli played as a defensive small forward and was lauded for his ability apply forward-half pressure and create turnovers among opposition defenders.

Statistics
Updated to the end of round 23, 2022.

|-
| 2016 ||  || 17
| 18 || 13 || 6 || 86 || 97 || 183 || 45 || 57 || 0.7 || 0.3 || 4.8 || 5.4 || 10.2 || 2.5 || 3.2 || 0
|-
| scope=row bgcolor=F0E68C | 2017#
|
| 17 || 25 || 25 || 13 || 144 || 127 || 271 || 69 || 85 || 1.0 || 0.5 || 5.8 || 5.1 || 10.8 || 2.8 || 3.4 || 0
|-
| 2018 ||  || 17
| 12 || 13 || 9 || 87 || 83 || 170 || 35 || 46 || 1.1 || 0.8 || 7.3 || 6.9 || 14.2 || 2.9 || 3.8 || 1
|-
| scope=row bgcolor=F0E68C | 2019#
|
| 17 || 22 || 17 || 19 || 138 || 124 || 262 || 62 || 61 || 0.8 || 0.9 || 6.3 || 5.6 || 11.9 || 2.8 || 2.8 || 0
|-
| scope=row bgcolor=F0E68C | 2020#
|
| 17 || 18 || 12 || 3 || 102 || 94 || 196 || 47 || 57 || 0.7 || 0.2 || 5.7 || 5.2 || 10.9 || 2.6 || 3.2 || 0
|-
| 2021 ||  || 17
| 19 || 9 || 6 || 120 || 127 || 247 || 54 || 46 || 0.5 || 0.3 || 6.3 || 6.7 || 13.0 || 2.8 || 2.4 || 0
|-
| 2022 ||  || 17
| 22 || 9 || 4 || 255 || 199 || 454 || 107 || 50 || 0.4 || 0.2 || 11.6 || 9.0 || 20.6 || 4.9 || 2.3 ||
|- class="sortbottom"
! colspan=3| Career
! 136
! 98
! 60
! 932
! 851
! 1783
! 419
! 402
! 0.7
! 0.4
! 6.9
! 6.3
! 13.1
! 3.1
! 3.0
! 1
|}

Notes

Honours and achievements
Team
 3x AFL premiership player: 2017, 2019, 2020 
 McClelland Trophy: 2018

Individual
22under22 team: 2017
 AFL Goal of the Year: 2017
 AFL Rising Star nominee: 2016

Personal life
He is the fourth in the Rioli family to play in the AFL, following in the footsteps of uncles, Dean and Maurice and cousin Cyril. His older cousin Willie Rioli joined the family's playing ranks when he debuted in 2018. He is also cousin to former Essendon player Michael Long. His younger brother Brayden is a member of 's Next Generation Academy, boarded at Daniel's alma mater St Patrick's College in Ballarat and has represented the Northern Territory at AFL Under 16 Championships.

Rioli lived with Richmond senior coach Damien Hardwick and his family for the first two years of his AFL career.

In March 2018 he began dating Mia Fevola, the daughter of former  and  forward, Brendan Fevola. They announced their separation in February 2020.

References

External links

Daniel Rioli's statistics from Footy Wire

Living people
1997 births
Greater Western Victoria Rebels players
Richmond Football Club players
Richmond Football Club Premiership players
Indigenous Australian players of Australian rules football
Australian rules footballers from the Northern Territory
St Mary's Football Club (NTFL) players
Tiwi Islands people
Rioli family
People educated at St Patrick's College, Ballarat
Three-time VFL/AFL Premiership players